Esporles is a locality and Spanish municipality of the autonomous community of the Balearic Islands.
Situated on the island of Majorca, around the zone of the Serra de Tramuntana.
It's about 15 km from Palma de Mallorca. The town is divided into Vilavella and Vilanova. In its territory it also includes small urbanizations, like Ses Rotgetes de Canet y Es Verger.

Its economy was traditionally based on agriculture and animal husbandry, which is shown in its mansion farm-museum La Granja. Tourism, like in most of the Balearic Islands is now the base of its economy. The textile industry was also very important in its economy, but in the present day there only remain traces of the factories or buildings. Some to this day remain empty but most have been transformed into housing. One of the biggest factories was transformed into the local library Sa Fabrica (opened in 2010).

Administration

Constitutional mayors (present-1979)

Monuments 
 Parochial church of Sant Pere
 Cor de Jesús
 Ermita de Maristella
 Parochial church of Esgleieta
 La Granja
 Son Tugores
 Canet

Culture
 Public school Gabriel Comas i Ribes
 Public institute Josep Font i Tries

Sports
 Football pitch in Son Quint (home of the local team C. E. Esporles).
 Municipal pavilion for Basketball
Tennis court in Son Quint (Currently abandoned and not maintained)
 Indoor Volleyball in Colegio Gabriel Comas i Ribas
 Rhythmic gymnastics in Colegio Gabriel Comas i Ribas
 Public open roof Swimming pool (only open in summer and spring)

Celebrations 
 Festes de Sant Pere (23 to 30 June), one of the most important celebrations. The popular correfoc, which has been incorporating in the events list of organizers since the ends of the XX century and the beginnings of the XXI century, is not a typical of any town of the Balearic Islands, its origins go back to the ancient Ball de Diables (The Dance of Devils), whose first dated written records are from the XII century Tarragona.

 La Fira Dolça (or The Sweet Fair is held on the first Sunday of October, this year 2020 its on the 4rt). The sweet and its derivatives are the protagonists of this fair held in Esporles form 2005, for the delight of those with a sweet tooth. Traditional products like the crespells, a dry paste of jewish origin which today are made in the shape of stars, flowers or circles, and others more modern products like cupcakes will alongside the visitors fill the streets of the town. There are also crafts, expositions, competitions, children's candy workshops, a designated place for embroidery and a specific spot dedicated for artesanal beers.

References

External links 

 Town Hall's website (in catalán)
 Informació de l'Institut Balear d'Estadística

Municipalities in Mallorca
Populated places in Mallorca